Chester Cummings was an American politician. He served as the 22nd mayor of Lancaster, Pennsylvania from 1902 to 1906.

References

Mayors of Lancaster, Pennsylvania
Year of birth missing
Year of death missing